This is a list of Estonian football transfers in the winter transfer window 2015–16 by club. Only transfers in Meistriliiga are included.

Meistriliiga

Flora

In:

Out:

Levadia

In: 

Out:

Nõmme Kalju

In: 

Out:

Infonet

In: 

Out:

Sillamäe Kalev

In: 

Out:

Narva Trans

In: 

Out:

Paide Linnameeskond

In: 

Out:

Pärnu Linnameeskond

In: 

Out:

Tammeka

In: 

Out:

Tarvas

In: 

Out:

See also
 2016 Meistriliiga

References

External links
Official website

Estonian
transfers
transfers
2015–16